Eco may refer to Ecology or Economics. It may also refer to:

Arts and entertainment 
 Eco (video game), a 1988 life simulation game
 Eco (2018 video game), a 2018 simulation game 
 Emil Chronicle Online, a 2005 Japanese MMO computer game
 English Chamber Orchestra, based in London
 Eco, a character in the Dragonar Academy light novel series
 Eco, a fictional substance in the Jak and Daxter games
 Eco, a character on the children's show The Shak

Government and politics 
 Economic Cooperation Organization, an international organization
 Environment and Conservation Organisations of Aotearoa New Zealand
 Environmental Commissioner of Ontario
 European Communications Office

Technology 
 .eco, a top-level domain for the Internet
 Eco - Association of the Internet Industry, the German Internet industry association
 Engineering change order

Other uses 
 Eco (currency), a proposed currency
 ECO: A Covenant Order of Evangelical Presbyterians, a Christian denomination
 Edison Chouest Offshore, an American shipbuilder
 Encyclopaedia of Chess Openings
 Energy Company Obligation, a government scheme in Great Britain 
 Environmental Children's Organization, a children's environment organization founded by Severn Suzuki in the 1990s
 Equity carve-out
 Esporte Clube Osasco, a Brazilian football club
 Eternally collapsing object
 Noticias ECO, a defunct television network
 Umberto Eco (1932–2016), Italian philosopher, semiotician, novelist

See also

 Ecco (disambiguation)
 Echo (disambiguation)
 Eko (disambiguation)
 Ekko (disambiguation)
 
 Eckō Unltd., a clothing brand
 EKCO, a British electronics company